Alim Qurbanov (born 5 December 1977) is a retired Azerbaijani footballer who spent most of his career playing for club Khazar Lankaran as a midfielder.

National team statistics

International goals

References

External links
 

1977 births
Living people
Azerbaijani footballers
Azerbaijan international footballers
Footballers from Baku
Khazar Lankaran FK players
Azerbaijan Premier League players
Association football midfielders